Starr Mountain is a mountain in the U.S. state of Tennessee. It is located in the Unicoi range of the Blue Ridge Mountains, part of the larger Appalachian Mountains, and is within the boundaries of the Cherokee National Forest.

Geography 
It is one of the southernmost mountains of the Unicoi Mountains, and is also on the western edge of the Blue Ridge province, bordered by the Ridge-and-Valley Appalachians to the west. The Hiwassee River flows along its southern base, separating it from Oswald Dome. Starr Mountain is located in Polk, McMinn, and Monroe counties, and its highest point is also the highest point in McMinn County.

References

Mountains of Tennessee
Cherokee National Forest
Landforms of Polk County, Tennessee
Landforms of McMinn County, Tennessee
Landforms of Monroe County, Tennessee